Russia, Bolshevism, and the Versailles Peace is a book by the American historian John M. Thompson (1926–2017) that discusses the impact of events in Russia on the activities of the Paris Peace Conference of 1919—1920; the work was first published by Princeton University Press in 1966.

References 

 Max Gunzenhäuser. Die Pariser Friedenskonferenz 1919 und die Friedensverträge 1919—1920. Literaturbericht und Bibliographie : [de]. — Frankfurt/M. : Bernard & Graefe, 1970. — vii, 287 S. — (Schriften der Bibliothek für Zeitgeschichte, Stuttgart: Heft 9).
 George Brinkley. The Bolsheviks - Isaac Deutscher: Stalin. (Second edition. New York: Oxford University Press, 1965. Pp. 661. $12.50.) - Francis B. Randall: Stalin's Russia. (New York: The Free Press, 1965. Pp. 328. $6.95.) - Adam B. Ulam: The Bolsheviks. (New York: Macmillan, 1965. Pp. 598. $9.95). - John M. Thompson: Russia, Bolshevism, and the Versailles Peace. (Studies of the Russian Institute of Columbia University Princeton: Princeton University Press, 1966. Pp. 429. $11.50). (англ.) // The Review of Politics. — 1968. — July (vol. 30, iss. 3). — P. 378–383. — ISSN 0034-6705. — DOI:10.1017/S0034670500041073.
 White J. Russia, Bolshevism, and the Versailles Peace by John M. Thompson // Indiana Magazine of History. — 1967. — September (vol. 63, iss. 3).
 Klaus Meyer. Review of Russia, Bolshevism, and the Versailles Peace [de] // Historische Zeitschrift. — 1969. — Februar (Bd. 208, H. 1). — S. 167.
 Jane Degras. John M. Thompson, Russia, Bolshevism, and the Versailles Peace. Princeton: Princeton University Press, 1967 (1966 on title page). Pages vii, 429. $11.50. “Studies of the Russian Institute, Columbia University.” // Slavic Review. — 1968. — March (vol. 27, iss. 1). — P. 149–151. — ISSN 0037-6779. — DOI:10.2307/2493936.
 Rex A. Wade. Review of Russia, Bolshevism and the Versailles Peace // Soviet Studies. — 1968. — July (vol. 20, iss. 1). — P. 148–149.
 Harry Hanak. Review of Russia, Bolshevism, and the Versailles Peace // The Slavonic and East European Review. — 1970. — October (vol. 48, iss. 113). — P. 616–617.
 Нарочницкая Н. А. Русская революция и мир в ХХ столетии: через призму «русского вопроса» на Парижской мирной конференции [ru] // «Перспективы» / Фонд исторической перспективы. — 2018. — 23 января.

External links 
 

1966 non-fiction books
English-language books
History books about World War I
History books about Russia
Princeton University Press books